Enduracididine is a non-proteinogenic α-amino acid that is a cyclic analogue of arginine. It is not genetically encoded into peptide sequences, but rather is generated as a posttranslational modification.

Biological roles
Enduracididine occurs rarely in nature, appearing principally in peptide antibiotics such as the antibacterial compounds enramycin and teixobactin.

References

Non-proteinogenic amino acids